Development of the automobile started in 1672 with the invention of the first steam-powered vehicle, which led to the creation of the first steam-powered automobile capable of human transportation, built by Nicolas-Joseph Cugnot in 1769. Inventors began to branch out at the start of the 19th century, creating the de Rivas engine, one of the first internal combustion engines, and an early electric motor. Samuel Brown later tested the first industrially applied internal combustion engine in 1826.

Development was hindered in the mid-19th century by a backlash against large vehicles, yet progress continued on some internal combustion engines. The engine evolved as engineers created two- and four-cycle combustion engines and began using gasoline as fuel. The first practical modern automobile and the first car put into series production appeared in 1886, when Carl Benz developed a gasoline-powered automobile and made several identical copies. Later automobile production was marked by the Ford Model T, created by the Ford Motor Company in 1908, which became the first automobile to be mass-produced on a moving assembly line.

Power sources
The early history of the automobile was concentrated on the search for a reliable portable power unit to propel the vehicle.

Steam-powered wheeled vehicles

17th and 18th centuries

Ferdinand Verbiest, a member of a Jesuit mission in China, built a steam-powered vehicle around 1672 as a toy for the Kangxi Emperor. It was small-scale and could not carry a driver but it was, quite possibly, the first working steam-powered vehicle ('auto-mobile').

Steam-powered self-propelled vehicles large enough to transport people and cargo were first devised in the late 18th century. Nicolas-Joseph Cugnot demonstrated his fardier à vapeur ("steam dray"), an experimental steam-driven artillery tractor, in 1770 and 1771. As Cugnot's design proved to be impractical, his invention was not developed in his native France. The center of innovation shifted to Great Britain. By 1784, William Murdoch had built a working model of a steam carriage in Redruth and in 1801 Richard Trevithick was running a full-sized vehicle on the roads in Camborne.

19th century

During the 19th century, attempts were made to introduce practical steam-powered vehicles. Innovations such as hand brakes, multispeed transmissions and better steering developed. Some commercially successful vehicles provided mass transit until a backlash against these large vehicles resulted in the passage of legislation such as the UK Locomotives Act 1865, which required many self-propelled vehicles on public roads to be preceded by a man on foot waving a red flag and blowing a horn. This effectively halted road auto development in the UK for most of the rest of the 19th century; inventors and engineers shifted their efforts to improvements in railway locomotives. The law was not repealed until 1896, although the need for the red flag was removed in 1878.

In 1816, a professor at Prague Polytechnic, Josef Bozek, built an oil-fired steam car. Walter Hancock, builder and operator of London steam busses, in 1838 built a two-seated car phaeton.

In 1867, Canadian jeweler Henry Seth Taylor demonstrated his four-wheeled "steam buggy" at the Stanstead Fair in Stanstead, Quebec and again the following year. The basis of the buggy, which he began building in 1865, was a high-wheeled carriage with bracing to support a two-cylinder steam engine mounted on the floor.

One of the first "real" automobiles was produced in 1873 by Frenchman Amédée Bollée in Le Mans, who built self-propelled steam road vehicles to transport groups of passengers.

The first automobile suitable for use on existing wagon roads in the US was a steam-powered vehicle invented in 1871 by Dr. J.W. Carhart, a minister of the Methodist Episcopal Church, in Racine, Wisconsin. It induced the state of Wisconsin in 1875 to offer a  award to the first to produce a practical substitute for the use of horses and other animals. The offer led to the first city to city automobile race in the US, starting on 16 July 1878 in Green Bay, Wisconsin, and ending in Madison, Wisconsin, via Appleton, Oshkosh, Waupun, Watertown, Fort Atkinson, and Janesville. While seven vehicles were registered, only two started to compete: the entries from Green Bay and Oshkosh. The vehicle from Green Bay was faster but broke down before completing the race. In 1879, the legislature awarded half the prize.

20th century
 Pre-WWII

Steam-powered road vehicles, both cars and wagons, reached the peak of their development in the early 1930s with fast-steaming lightweight boilers and efficient engine designs. Internal combustion engines also developed greatly during World War I, becoming simpler to operate and more reliable. The development of the high-speed diesel engine from 1930 began to replace them for wagons, accelerated in the UK by tax changes making steam wagons uneconomic overnight. Although a few designers continued to advocate steam power, no significant developments in the production of steam cars took place after Doble in 1931.

 Post-WWII
Whether steam cars will ever be reborn in later technological eras remains to be seen. Magazines such as Light Steam Power continued to describe them into the 1980s. The 1950s saw interest in steam-turbine cars powered by small nuclear reactors (this was also true of aircraft), but the fears about the dangers inherent in nuclear fission technology soon killed these ideas.

Electric automobiles

19th century
In 1828, Ányos Jedlik, a Hungarian who invented an early type of electric motor, created a tiny model car powered by his new motor. In 1834, Vermont blacksmith Thomas Davenport, the inventor of the first American DC electric motor, installed his motor in a small model car, which he operated on a short circular electrified track. In 1835, Professor Sibrandus Stratingh of Groningen, the Netherlands and his assistant Christopher Becker created a small-scale electrical car, powered by non-rechargeable primary cells. In England, a patent was granted in 1840 for the use of tracks as conductors of electric current, and similar American patents were issued to Lilley and Colten in 1847.

Sources point to different creations as the first electric car. Between 1832 and 1839 (the exact year is uncertain) Robert Anderson of Scotland invented a crude electric carriage, powered by non-rechargeable primary cells. In November 1881, French inventor Gustave Trouvé demonstrated a working three-wheeled car powered by electricity at the International Exposition of Electricity, Paris. English inventor Thomas Parker, who was responsible for innovations such as electrifying the London Underground, overhead tramways in Liverpool and Birmingham, and the smokeless fuel coalite, built the first production electric car in London in 1884, using his own specially designed high-capacity rechargeable batteries. However, others regard the Flocken Elektrowagen of 1888 by German inventor Andreas Flocken as the first true electric car.

20th century
Electric cars enjoyed popularity between the late 19th century and early 20th century, when electricity was among the preferred methods for automobile propulsion, providing a level of comfort and ease of operation that could not be achieved by the gasoline cars of the time. Advances in internal combustion technology, especially the electric starter, soon rendered this advantage moot; the greater range of gasoline cars, quicker refueling times, and growing petroleum infrastructure, along with the mass production of gasoline vehicles by companies such as the Ford Motor Company, which reduced prices of gasoline cars to less than half that of equivalent electric cars, led to a decline in the use of electric propulsion, effectively removing it from important markets such as the US by the 1930s. 1997 saw the Toyota RAV4 EV and the Nissan Altra, the first production battery electric cars to use NiMH and Li-ion batteries (instead of heavier lead acid) respectively.

21st century
In recent years, increased concerns over the environmental impact of gasoline cars, higher gasoline prices, improvements in battery technology, and the prospect of peak oil have brought about renewed interest in electric cars, which are perceived to be more environmentally friendly and cheaper to maintain and run, despite high initial costs.

Internal combustion engines

Gas mixtures

The lack of suitable fuels, particularly liquids, hampered early attempts at making and using internal combustion engines—therefore some of the earliest engines used gas mixtures. Christiaan Huyghens (1629–1695) built a powder-powered internal combustion engine to supply water for irrigation of Versailles palace gardens, used as latrines by visitors.

Several early experimenters used gases. In 1806, the Swiss engineer François Isaac de Rivaz built an engine powered by internal combustion of a hydrogen and oxygen mixture. In 1826, Englishman Samuel Brown tested his hydrogen-fueled internal combustion engine by using it to propel a vehicle up Shooter's Hill in southeast London. A later version was propelled by coal gas. A Delamare-Deboutteville vehicle was patented and trialed in 1884.

The use of autogas (LPG) or natural gas in vehicles can become sporadically popular—often depending on the supply and cost of gasoline.

Gasoline
Nicolaus Otto and Eugen Langen had built a working engine in 1867. About 1870, in Vienna, Austria (then the Austro-Hungarian Empire), inventor Siegfried Marcus put a liquid-fueled internal combustion engine on a simple handcart which made him the first man to propel a vehicle by means of gasoline. Today, this is known as "the first Marcus car" but would be better described as a cart. His second car, built and run in 1875, was the first petrol driven car and is housed at the Vienna Technial Museum. In 1883, Marcus secured a German patent for a low-voltage ignition system of the magneto type; this was his only automotive patent. This design was used for all further engines. This ignition, in conjunction with the "rotating-brush carburetor", made the engine design innovative. During his lifetime, he was honored as the originator of the motorcar but his place in history was all but erased by the Nazis during World War II. Because Marcus was of Jewish descent, the Nazi propaganda office ordered his work to be destroyed, his name expunged from future textbooks, and his public memorials removed, giving credit instead to Karl Benz.

Several inventors developed their own version of practical automobiles with petrol/gasoline-powered internal combustion engines in the last two decades of the 19th century: Karl Benz built his first automobile in 1885 in Mannheim. Benz was granted a patent for his automobile on 29 January 1886, and began the first production of automobiles in 1888, after Bertha Benz, his wife, had proved—with the first long-distance trip in August 1888, from Mannheim to Pforzheim and back—that the horseless coach was capable of extended travel. Since 2008 a Bertha Benz Memorial Route commemorates this event.

Soon after, Gottlieb Daimler and Wilhelm Maybach in Stuttgart in 1889 designed a vehicle from scratch to be an automobile, rather than a horse-drawn carriage fitted with an engine. They also are usually credited with invention of the first motorcycle in 1886, but Italy's Enrico Bernardi of the University of Padua, in 1882, patented a   one-cylinder petrol motor, fitting it into his son's tricycle, making it at least a candidate for the first automobile and first motorcycle. Bernardi enlarged the tricycle in 1892 to carry two adults.

The first four-wheeled petrol-driven automobile in Britain was built in Walthamstow by Frederick Bremer in 1892. Another was made in Birmingham in 1895 by Frederick William Lanchester, who also patented the disc brake. The first electric starter was installed on an Arnold, an adaptation of the Benz Velo, built in Kent between 1895 and 1898.

George Foote Foss of Sherbrooke, Quebec built a single-cylinder gasoline car in 1896 which he drove for four years, ignoring city officials' warnings of arrest for his "mad antics".

In all the turmoil, many early pioneers are nearly forgotten. In 1891, John William Lambert built a three-wheeler in Ohio City, Ohio, which was destroyed in a fire the same year, while Henry Nadig constructed a four-wheeler in Allentown, Pennsylvania. It is likely they were not the only ones.

Eras of invention

Horseless carriage or Veteran era

The American George B. Selden filed for a patent on 8 May 1879. His application included not only the engine but its use in a four-wheeled car. Selden filed a series of amendments to his application which stretched out the legal process, resulting in a delay of 16 years before the patent was granted on 5 November 1895. Selden licensed his patent to most major American automakers, collecting a fee on each car they produced and creating the Association of Licensed Automobile Manufacturers. The Ford Motor Company fought this patent in court, and eventually won on appeal. Henry Ford testified that the patent did more to hinder than encourage development of autos in the US.

The first production of automobiles was by Karl Benz in 1888 in Germany and, under license from Benz, in France by Emile Roger. There were numerous others, including tricycle builders Rudolf Egg, Edward Butler, and Léon Bollée. Bollée, using a  engine of his own design, enabled his driver, Jamin, to average  in the 1897 Paris-Tourville rally. By 1900, mass production of automobiles had begun in France and the US.

The first company formed exclusively to build automobiles was Panhard et Levassor in France, which also introduced the first four-cylinder engine. Formed in 1889, Panhard was quickly followed by Peugeot two years later. By the start of the 20th century, the automobile industry was beginning to take off in Western Europe, especially in France, where 30,204 were produced in 1903, representing 48.8 percent of world automobile production that year.

Across the northern US, local mechanics experimented with a wide variety of prototypes. In the state of Iowa, for example, by 1890 Jesse O. Wells drove a steam-powered Locomobile. There were numerous experiments in electric vehicles driven by storage batteries. First users ordered the early gasoline-powered cars, including Haynes, Mason, and Duesenberg automobiles. Blacksmiths and mechanics started operating repair and gasoline stations. In Springfield, Massachusetts, brothers Charles and Frank Duryea founded the Duryea Motor Wagon Company in 1893, becoming the first American automobile manufacturing company. The Autocar Company, founded in 1897, established a number of innovations still in use and remains the oldest operating motor vehicle manufacturer in the US. However, it was Ransom E. Olds and his Olds Motor Vehicle Company (later known as Oldsmobile) who would dominate this era with the introduction of the Oldsmobile Curved Dash. Its production line was running in 1901. The Thomas B. Jeffery Company developed the world's second mass-produced automobile, and 1,500 Ramblers were built and sold in its first year, representing one-sixth of all existing motorcars in the US at the time. Within a year, Cadillac (formed from the Henry Ford Company), Winton, and Ford were also producing cars in the thousands. In South Bend, Indiana, the Studebaker brothers, having become the world's leading manufacturers of horse-drawn vehicles, made a transition to electric automobiles in 1902, and gasoline engines in 1904. They continued to build horse-drawn vehicles until 1919.

The first motor car in Central Europe was produced by the Austro-Hungarian company Nesselsdorfer Wagenbau (later renamed to Tatra in today's Czech Republic) in 1897, the Präsident automobile. In 1898, Louis Renault had a De Dion-Bouton modified, with fixed drive shaft and differential, making "perhaps the first hot rod in history" and bringing Renault and his brothers into the car industry. Innovation was rapid and rampant, with no clear standards for basic vehicle architectures, body styles, construction materials, or controls; for example, many veteran cars use a tiller, rather than a wheel for steering. During 1903, Rambler standardized on the steering wheel and moved the driver's position to the left-hand side of the vehicle. Chain drive was dominant over the drive shaft, and closed bodies were extremely rare. Drum brakes were introduced by Renault in 1902. The next year, Dutch designer Jacobus Spijker built the first four-wheel drive racing car; it never competed and it would be 1965 and the Jensen FF before four-wheel drive was used on a production car.

Within a few years, a dizzying assortment of technologies were being used by hundreds of producers all over the western world. Steam, electricity, and petrol/gasoline-powered automobiles competed for decades, with petrol/gasoline internal combustion engines achieving dominance by the 1910s. Many modern advances, including gas/electric hybrids, multi-valve engines, overhead camshafts, and four-wheel drive, were attempted and discarded at this time.

Innovation was not limited to the vehicles themselves. Increasing numbers of cars propelled the growth of the petroleum industry, as well as the development of technology to produce gasoline (replacing kerosene and coal oil) and of improvements in heat-tolerant mineral oil lubricants (replacing vegetable and animal oils).

There were social effects, also. Music would be made about cars, such as "In My Merry Oldsmobile" (a tradition that continues) while, in 1896, William Jennings Bryan would be the first presidential candidate to campaign in a car (a donated Mueller), in Decatur, Illinois. Also in 1899, Akron, Ohio, adopted the first self-propelled paddy wagon.

By 1900, the early centers of national automotive industry developed in many countries, including Belgium (home to Vincke, that copied Benz; Germain, a pseudo-Panhard; and Linon and Nagant, both based on the Gobron-Brillié), Switzerland (led by Fritz Henriod, Rudolf Egg, Saurer, Johann Weber, and Lorenz Popp), Vagnfabrik AB in Sweden, Hammel (by A. F. Hammel and H. U. Johansen at Copenhagen, in Denmark, which only built one car, ca. 1886), Irgens (starting in Bergen, Norway, in 1883, but without success), Italy (where FIAT started in 1899), and as far afield as Australia (where Pioneer set up shop in 1898, with an already archaic paraffin-fueled center-pivot-steered wagon). Meanwhile, the export trade had begun, with Koch exporting cars and trucks from Paris to Tunisia, Egypt, Iran, and the Dutch East Indies. Motor cars were also exported to British colonies, for example, the first was shipped to India in 1897.

Throughout the veteran car era, the automobile was seen more as a novelty than as a genuinely useful device. Breakdowns were frequent, fuel was difficult to obtain, roads suitable for traveling were scarce, and rapid innovation meant that a year-old car was nearly worthless. Many older cars made were made with an assembly line that would help mass-produce cars, a system that continues to be used because of its efficiency.

Brass or Edwardian era

The Brass or Edwardian period lasted from roughly 1905 through 1914 and the beginning of World War I. It is generally referred to as the Edwardian era, but in the US is often known as the Brass era from the widespread use of brass in vehicles during this time.

Within the 15 years that make up this era, the various experimental designs and alternate power systems would be marginalized. Although the modern touring car had been invented earlier, it was not until Panhard et Levassor's Système Panhard was widely licensed and adopted that recognizable and standardized automobiles were created. This system specified front-engine, rear-wheel drive internal combustion-engine cars with a sliding gear transmission. Traditional coach-style vehicles were rapidly abandoned, and buckboard runabouts lost favor with the introduction of tonneaus and other less-expensive touring bodies.

By 1906, steam car development had advanced, and they were among the fastest road vehicles in that period.

Throughout this era, development of automotive technology was rapid, due in part to hundreds of small manufacturers competing to gain the world's attention. Key developments included the electric ignition system (by dynamotor on the Arnold car in 1898, though Robert Bosch, 1903, tends to get the credit), independent suspension (actually conceived by Bollée in 1873), and four-wheel brakes (by the Arrol-Johnston Company of Scotland in 1909). Leaf springs were widely used for suspension, though many other systems were still in use, with angle steel taking over from armored wood as the frame material of choice. Transmissions and throttle controls were widely adopted, allowing a variety of cruising speeds, though vehicles generally still had discrete speed settings, rather than the infinitely variable system familiar in cars of later eras. Safety glass also made its debut, patented by John Crewe Wood in England in 1905. (It would not become standard equipment until 1926, on a Rickenbacker.)

Between 1907 and 1912 in the US, the high-wheel motor buggy (resembling the horse buggy of before 1900) was in its heyday, with over 75 makers including Holsman (Chicago), IHC (Chicago), and Sears (which sold via catalog); the high-wheeler would be killed by the Model T. In 1912, Hupp (in the US, supplied by Hale & Irwin) and BSA (in the UK) pioneered the use of all-steel bodies, joined in 1914 by Dodge (who produced Model T bodies). While it would be another two decades before all-steel bodies would be standard, the change would mean improved supplies of superior-quality wood for furniture makers.

The 1908 New York to Paris Race was the first circumnavigation of the world by automobile. German, French, Italian, and American teams began in New York City 12 February 1908 with three of the competitors ultimately reaching Paris. The US-built Thomas Flyer with George Schuster (driver) won the race covering  in 169 days. Also in 1908, the first South American automobile was built in Peru, the Grieve. In 1909, Rambler became the first car company to equip its cars with a spare tire that was mounted on a fifth wheel.

Some examples of cars of the period included:
 1907 Takuri—the first entirely Japanese-made gasoline engine car produced by Komanosuke Uchiyama in April 1907. Also, in Japan, the Hatsudoki Seizo Co. Ltd. is formed, which was later renamed in 1951 as Daihatsu Kōgyō Kabushiki-gaisha.
 1908–1927 Ford Model T—the most widely produced and available four-seater car of the era. It used a planetary transmission, and had a pedal-based control system. Ford T was proclaimed as the most influential car of the 20th century in the international Car of the Century awards.
 1909 Morgan Runabout—a popular cyclecar, cyclecars were sold in far greater quantities than four-seater cars in this period.
 1910 Mercer Raceabout—regarded as one of the first sports cars, the Raceabout expressed the exuberance of the driving public, as did the similarly conceived American Underslung and Hispano-Suiza Alphonso.
 1910–1920 Bugatti Type 13—a notable racing and touring model with advanced engineering and design. Similar models were Types 15, 17, 22, and 23.
 1914–1917 Dattogo—a two-cylinder,  "all-Japanese" car manufactured in seven units by the Kaishinsha Motor Works operated by Masujiro Hashimoto in Tokyo, while importing, assembling, and selling British cars. Kaishinsha was the first automobile manufacturing business in Japan.
 1917 Mitsubishi Model A—an all hand-built car built by Japanese company Mitsubishi in limited numbers for Japanese executives.

Vintage era

The vintage era lasted from the end of World War I (1918), through to the Wall Street Crash at the end of 1929. During this period the front-engine car came to dominate with closed bodies and standardized controls becoming the norm. In 1919, 90 percent of cars sold were open; by 1929, 90 percent were closed. Development of the internal combustion engine continued at a rapid pace, with multivalve and overhead camshaft engines produced at the high end, and V8, V12, and even V16 engines conceived for the ultrarich. Also in 1919, hydraulic brakes were invented by Malcolm Loughead (cofounder of Lockheed); they were adopted by Duesenberg for their 1921 Model A. Three years later, Hermann Rieseler of Vulcan Motor invented the first automatic transmission, which had two-speed planetary gearbox, torque converter, and lockup clutch; it never entered production. (It would only become an available option in 1940.) Just at the end of the vintage era, tempered glass (now standard equipment in side windows) was invented in France. In this era the revolutionary pontoon design of cars without fully articulated fenders, running boards and other noncompact ledge elements was introduced in small series but mass production of such cars was started much later (after WWII).

American auto companies in the 1920s expected they would soon sell six million cars a year but did not do so until 1955. Numerous companies disappeared. Between 1922 and 1925, the number of US passenger car builders decreased from 175 to 70. H. A. Tarantous, managing editor of "MoToR Member Society of Automotive Engineers", in a New York Times article from 1925, suggested many were unable to raise production and cope with falling prices (due to assembly line production), especially for lowpriced cars. The new pyroxylin-based paints, eight-cylinder engine, four-wheel brakes, and balloon tires as the biggest trends for 1925.

Examples of period vehicles:
 1922–1939 Austin 7—a widely copied vehicle serving as a template for many cars such as BMW and Nissan.
 1922–1931 Lancia Lambda—an advanced car for the time, first car to feature a load-bearing monocoque and independent front suspension.
 1924–1929 Bugatti Type 35—one of the most successful racing cars with over 1,000 victories in five years.
 1925–1928 Hanomag 2/10 PS—early example of pontoon styling.
 1927–1931 Ford Model A (1927–1931)—after keeping the brass era Model T in production for too long, Ford broke from the past by restarting its model series with the 1927 Model A. More than four million were produced, making it the bestselling model of the era. The Ford Model A was a prototype for the beginning of Soviet mass car production (GAZ A).
 1930 Cadillac V-16—developed at the height of the vintage era, the V16-powered Cadillac would join Bugatti's Royale as a legendary ultraluxury car of the era.

Pre-war era

The pre-war part of the classic era began with the Great Depression in 1930, and ended with the recovery after World War II, commonly placed during 1946. It was in this period that integrated fenders and fully-closed bodies began to dominate sales, with the new saloon/sedan body style even incorporating a trunk or boot at the rear for storage. The old open-top runabouts, phaetons, and touring cars were largely phased out by the end of the classic era as wings, running boards, and headlights were gradually integrated with the body of the car.

By the 1930s, most of the mechanical technology used in today's automobiles had been invented, although some things were later "re-invented", and credited to someone else. For example, front-wheel drive was re-introduced by André Citroën with the launch of the Traction Avant in 1934, though it had appeared several years earlier in road cars made by Alvis and Cord, and in racing cars by Miller (and may have appeared as early as 1897). In the same vein, the independent suspension was originally conceived by Amédée Bollée in 1873, but not put in production until appearing on the low-volume Mercedes-Benz 380 in 1933, which prodded American makers to use it more widely. In 1930, the number of auto manufacturers declined sharply as the industry consolidated and matured, thanks in part to the effects of the Great Depression.

Examples of pre-war automobiles:
 1932–1939 Alvis Speed 20—the first with all-synchromesh gearbox
 1932–1948 Ford V-8 (Model B)—introduction of the flathead V8 in mainstream vehicles
 1934–1938 Tatra 77—first serial-produced car with an aerodynamical design
 1934–1940 Bugatti Type 57—a refined automobile for the wealthy
 1934–1956 Citroën Traction Avant—first mass-produced front-wheel drive car, built with monocoque chassis
 1936–1955 MG T series—sports cars
 1938–2003 Volkswagen Beetle—a design that was produced for over 60 years with over 20 million units assembled in several countries
 1936–1939 Rolls-Royce Phantom III—V12 engine

Postwar era

A major change in automobile design since World War II was the popularity of pontoon style, in which running boards were eliminated and fenders were incorporated into the body. Among the first representatives of the style were the Soviet GAZ-M20 Pobeda (1946), British Standard Vanguard (1947), US Studebaker Champion, and Kaiser (1946), as well as the Czech Tatra T600 Tatraplan (1946) and the Italian Cisitalia 220 sports car (1947).

Automobile design and production finally emerged from the military orientation and other shadow of war in 1949, the year that in the US saw the introduction of high-compression V8 engines and modern bodies from General Motors's Oldsmobile and Cadillac brands. Hudson introduced the "step-down" design with the 1948 Commodore, which placed the passenger compartment down inside the perimeter of the frame, that was one of the first new-design postwar cars made and featured trend-setting slab-side styling. The unibody/strut-suspended 1951 Ford Consul joined the 1948 Morris Minor and 1949 Rover P4 in the automobile market in the UK. In Italy, Enzo Ferrari was beginning his 250 series, just as Lancia introduced the revolutionary V6-powered Aurelia.

Throughout the 1950s, engine power and vehicle speeds rose, designs became more integrated and artful, and automobiles were marketed internationally. Alec Issigonis's Mini and Fiat's 500 diminutive cars were introduced in Europe, while the similar kei car class became popular in Japan. The Volkswagen Beetle continued production after World War II and began exports to other nations, including the US. At the same time, Nash introduced the Nash Rambler, the first successful modern compact car made in the US, while the standard models produced by the "Big Three" domestic automakers grew ever larger in size, featuring increasing amounts of chrome trim, and luxury was exemplified by the Cadillac Eldorado Brougham. The markets in Europe expanded with new small-sized automobiles, as well as expensive grand tourers (GT), like the Ferrari America.

The market changed in the 1960s, as the US "Big Three" automakers began facing competition from imported cars, the European makers adopted advanced technologies and Japan emerged as a car-producing nation. Japanese companies began to export some of their more popular selling cars in Japan internationally, such as the Toyota Corolla, Toyota Corona, Nissan Sunny, and Nissan Bluebird in the mid-1960s. The success of American Motors's compact-sized Rambler models spurred GM and Ford to introduce their own downsized cars in 1960. Performance engines became a focus of marketing by US automakers, exemplified by the era's muscle cars. In 1964, the Ford Mustang developed a new market segment, the pony car. New models to compete with the Mustang included the Chevrolet Camaro, AMC Javelin, and Plymouth Barracuda.

Captive imports and badge engineering increased in the US and the UK as amalgamated groups such as the British Motor Corporation consolidated the market. BMC's space-saving and trend-setting transverse engine, front-wheel-drive, independent suspension and monocoque bodied Mini, which first appeared in 1959, was marketed under the Austin and Morris names, until Mini became a marque in its own right in 1969. Competition increased, with Studebaker, a pioneering automaker, shutting down, and the trend for consolidation reached Italy where niche makers like Maserati, Ferrari, and Lancia were acquired by larger companies. By the end of the decade, the number of automobile marques had been greatly reduced.

Technology developments included the widespread use of independent suspensions, wider application of fuel injection, and an increasing focus on safety in automotive design. Innovations during the 1960s included NSU's Wankel engine, the gas turbine, and the turbocharger. Of these, only the last endured, pioneered by General Motors, and adopted by BMW and Saab, later seeing mass-market use during the 1980s by Chrysler. Mazda continued developing its Wankel engine, in spite of problems in longevity, emissions, and fuel economy. Other Wankel licensees, including Mercedes-Benz and GM, never put their designs into production because of engineering and manufacturing problems, as well as the lessons from the 1973 oil crisis.

The 1970s were turbulent years for automakers and buyers with major events reshaping the industry such as the 1973 oil crisis, stricter automobile emissions control and safety requirements, increasing exports by the Japanese and European automakers, as well as growth in inflation and the stagnant economic conditions in many nations. Smaller-sized cars grew in popularity. During the Malaise era, the US saw the establishment of the subcompact segment with the introduction of the AMC Gremlin, followed by the Chevrolet Vega and Ford Pinto. The station wagon (estate, break, kombi, universal) body design was popular, as well as increasing sales of noncommercial all-wheel drive off-road vehicles.

Toward the end of the 20th century, the US Big Three (GM, Ford, and Chrysler) partially lost their leading position, Japan became for a while the world's leader of car production and cars began to be mass manufactured in new Asian, East European, and other countries.

Examples of postwar cars:
 1946–1958 GAZ-M20 Pobeda—Soviet car with full pontoon design
 1947–1958 Standard Vanguard—British mass-market car with full pontoon design
 1948–1971 Morris Minor—an early postwar car exported around the world
 1953–1971 Chevrolet Bel Air and 1953–2002 Cadillac Eldorado Brougham—first generations were representative of tailfin design
 1955–1976 Citroën DS—aerodynamic design and innovative technology, awarded third place as Car of the 20th Century
 1959–2000 Mini—a radical and innovative small car that was manufactured for four decades; awarded second place as Car of the 20th Century
 1960-1990 Volkswagen Brasília
 1961–1975 Jaguar E-Type—a classic sports car design
 1963–1989 Porsche 911—a sports car was awarded fifth place as Car of the 20th Century
 1964–present Ford Mustang—the pony car that became one of the bestselling cars of the era
 1966–end of the 20th century Fiat 124—an Italian car that was produced under license in many other countries including the Soviet Union
 1966–1971 Subaru 1000—one of the first Japanese built sedans using a boxer engine, front wheel drive and introducing the "double offset joint" driveshaft to the front wheels
 1967 NSU Ro 80—the basic wedge profile of this design was emulated in subsequent decades, unlike its Wankel engine
 late 1960s–early 1980s Gurgel BR-800
 late 1960s–early 1980s Gurgel Supermini
 1969 Nissan S30—Japanese sports car
 1977–present Lada Niva—the first mass-produced full-time all-wheel drive car

Modern era

The modern era is normally defined as the 40 years preceding the current year. The modern era has been one of increasing standardization, platform sharing, and computer-aided design—to reduce costs and development time—and of increasing use of electronics for both engine management and entertainment systems.

Some particular contemporary developments are the proliferation of front- and all-wheel drive, the adoption of the diesel engine, and the ubiquity of fuel injection. Most modern passenger cars are front-wheel-drive monocoque or unibody designs, with transversely mounted engines.

Body styles have changed as well in the modern era. Three types, the hatchback, sedan, and sport utility vehicle, dominate today's market. All originally emphasized practicality, but have mutated into today's high-powered luxury crossover SUV, sports wagon, and two-volume Large MPV. The rise of pickup trucks in the US and SUVs worldwide has changed the face of motoring with these "trucks" coming to command more than half of the world automobile market. There was also the introduction of the MPV class (smaller noncommercial passenger minivans), among the first of which were the French Renault Espace and the Chrysler minivan versions in the US.

The modern era has also seen rapidly improving fuel efficiency and engine output. The automobile emissions concerns have been eased with computerized engine management systems.

The financial crisis of 2007–2008 cut almost a third of light vehicle sales from Chrysler, Toyota, Ford, and Nissan. It also subtracted about a fourth of Honda's sales and about a seventh of sales from General Motors.

Since 2009, China has become the world's largest car manufacturer with production greater than Japan, the US, and all of Europe. Besides the increasing car production in Asian and other countries, there has been growth in transnational corporate groups, with the production of transnational automobiles sharing the same platforms as well as badge engineering or rebadging to suit different markets and consumer segments.

Since the end of the 20th century, several award competitions for cars and trucks have become widely known, such as European Car of the Year, Car of the Year Japan, North American Car of the Year, World Car of the Year, Truck of the Year, and International Car of the Year.

Examples of modern cars:
 1966–1992 Oldsmobile Toronado—First modern-era American car with front wheel drive as well as introduced electronic antilock braking system and airbag.
 1972–present Mercedes-Benz S-Class—Seat belt pretensioner, and electronic traction control system
 1975–present BMW 3 Series—the 3 Series has been on Car and Driver magazine's annual Ten Best list 17 times
 1977–present Honda Accord saloon/sedan—a Japanese sedan that became popular in the US
 1983–present Chrysler minivans—the two-box minivan design nearly pushed the station wagon out of the market
 1984–present Renault Espace—first mass one-volume car of noncommercial MPV class
 1986–2019 Ford Taurus—a midsized front-wheel drive sedan that dominated the US market in the late 1980s
 1997–present Toyota Prius—launched in the Japanese market and became a popular hybrid electric vehicle in many markets.
 1998–present Ford Focus—a popular hatchbacks and Ford's bestselling world car
 2008–2012 Tesla Roadster—first highway-capable all-electric vehicle in serial production for sale in the US in the modern era. Sold about 2,500 units worldwide.
 2008–2013 BYD F3DM—first highway-capable series production plugin hybrid, launched in China in December 2008, sold over 2,300 units.
 2009–present, Mitsubishi i-MiEV—first highway-capable series production all-electric car, launched in Japan in July 2009 for fleet customers, and in April 2010 for retail customers. Rebadged versions of the i-MiEV are sold in Europe by PSA Peugeot Citroën (PSA) as the Peugeot iOn and Citroën C-Zero.
 2010–present, Nissan Leaf and Chevrolet Volt—all-electric car and plugin hybrid correspondingly, launched in December 2010, are the world's top selling mass production vehicles of their kind. , global Volt sales totaled over 100,000. Nissan Leaf global sales achieved the 300,000 unit milestone in January 2018, making the Leaf the world's all-time bestselling highway-capable electric car in history.
 2012–present, Tesla Model S—Plugin electric vehicle was ranked as the world's bestselling plugin electric vehicle in 2015. It was also named car of the century by Car and Driver.

Iconic modern cars include:
 1963–1965, Aston Martin DB5, as used by James Bond in Goldfinger, the first of the James Bond movie franchise. This long-running franchise featured later Aston Martin sports and touring cars. 
 1981–1983, DMC DeLorean, in stainless steel with gull-wing doors, featured in the Back to the Future movie franchise.

See also

 Automotive industry – current production and companies
 History of the internal combustion engine
 History of transport
 Motocycle
List of motorcycles of the 1890s
 Timeline of motor vehicle brands
 Timeline of North American automobiles

Beginnings
Benz Patent Motorwagen ("patent motorcar"; 1885), three-wheel vehicle widely regarded as the world's first production automobile
Benz Velo (1894), followup 4-wheel model of the Benz Patent Motorwagen

Early developments essential to the development of automobiles
Nicolas Léonard Sadi Carnot, physics of the internal combustion engine
Illuminating gas, first internal combustion engine fuel
Ligroin or heavy naphtha, first liquid automotive fuel, n-hexane

Car and car engine designers, chronologically by first vehicle/engine built
Nicolaus Otto, developer of the first successful compressed charge gaseous fueled internal combustion engine (1860s-70s)
Wilhelm Maybach, designed engines starting in the 1870s-80s; first motorbike (1885), second internal combustion car (1889)
Gottlieb Daimler, German engineer, pioneer of internal-combustion engines and automobile development (1870s and on)

References

Further reading

Early sources
  Includes photos of many c.1906 special purpose automobiles.

External links

 Automuseum Dr. Carl Benz, Ladenburg/Germany
 Bertha Benz Memorial Route
 University of Washington Libraries Digital Collections – Transportation photographs Digital collection depicting various modes of transportation (including automobiles) in the Pacific Northwest region and western US during the first half of the 20th century.
 History of the automobile on About.com:Inventors site
 History of Automobile Air Conditioning on NYC.net
 Automotive History – An ongoing photographic history of the automobile.
 Taking the Wheel, Manufacturers' catalogs from the first decade of American automobiles

 
Automobile
Automobile